Local elections were held in Naga City on May 13, 2013 within the Philippine general election. The voters voted for the elective local posts in the city: the mayor, vice mayor, and ten councilors.

Mayoral and vice mayoral elections

City Council
Election in the city council is at large at 10 seats will be on the line.

|-
|bgcolor=black colspan=5|

2013 Philippine local elections
Politics of Naga, Camarines Sur